Graeme C. Clark is currently the Canadian Ambassador to Mexico. Previously, he served as Canadian Ambassador to Peru and Bolivia (1997-2001), as Ambassador, Permanent Representative to the Organization of American States in Washington, D.C. (2006-2010), and as Minister, Deputy Head of Mission to the Canadian Embassy, Paris (2014-2019).

External links
 Organization of American States biography
 Department of Foreign Affairs and International Trade profile

Living people
Year of birth missing (living people)
Ambassadors of Canada to Peru
Permanent Representatives of Canada to the Organization of American States
Place of birth missing (living people)
Ambassadors of Canada to Bolivia
Alumni of Merton College, Oxford